Chandpur is a village in Hailakandi district of Assam state of India.

See also
 Hailakandi district

References

Villages in Hailakandi district